The following is a list of encyclopedic people associated with the University of Arizona. Notable alumni include a former U.S. Secretary of the Interior, a former U.S. Surgeon General,  five U.S. Senators, two Republican U.S. Presidential nominees, the creator of the television series Sesame Street and founder of Sesame Workshop, the owner of the Los Angeles Angels of Anaheim Major League Baseball team, and several NASA astronauts.

Notable alumni and former students

Academia
Martin Z. Bazant (BS 1992, MS 1993) - E. G. Roos (1944) Chair Professor of Chemical Engineering the Massachusetts Institute of Technology (MIT).
 Noam Chomsky – UA Laureate Professor of Linguistics, Agnese Nelms Haury Chair 
 Lee Giles (PhD 1981) – computer scientist, co-creator of CiteSeer, David Reese Professor of Information Sciences and Technology, Pennsylvania State University
 Ghanim Al-Jumaily (MS 1983) – professor of engineering, Southern New Hampshire University; former Iraqi diplomat
 Alan C. Newell – UA Regents Professor of Mathematics 
 Ed Renwick (1968) – political scientist and television commentator in New Orleans, Louisiana
 Shauna Shapiro – professor of psychology, Santa Clara University
 David Soren (1983) – UA Regents Professor of Classics and Director of the Orvieto Institute in Umbria
 Gordon Willey (BS 1935, MS 1936) – pioneer of processual archaeology, Harvard University professor
 Vladimir E. Zakharov – UA Regents Professor Emeritus of Mathematics

Arts and media

 Agha Shahid Ali – poet
 Samaire Armstrong – actress
 Denise Austin – fitness instructor
 Michael Biehn (1974) – actor, Aliens, Terminator
 Lynn Borden (1959) – actress and Miss Arizona (1957)
 Jerry Bruckheimer (1965) – film and television producer
 Jos Charles – poet
 Tom Chilton – MMORPG game developer
 Fred Christenson – television executive
 Robert D. Cocke – artist
 Joan Ganz Cooney – creator of Sesame Street
 Ted DeGrazia – painter, sculptor
 Louis Delsarte – artist
 George Gray — game show host and announcer
 Alex Flanagan – sports journalist
 Savannah Guthrie – co-host of The Today Show
 Earl Hindman – actor, Wilson W. Wilson, Home Improvement
 Louis Hock – independent filmmaker
 Rick Hoffman – actor
 John Hughes – film director, producer, screenwriter
 Daniel Humbarger – stand-up comedian
 J.A. Jance – mystery writer
 Nicole Randall Johnson – actress and comedian
 Kourtney Kardashian – television personality
 Kitty Kelley – author
 Barbara Kingsolver (1981, MS Biology) – author
 Greg Kinnear (1985) – actor
 Don Knotts – actor
 Aline Kominsky-Crumb (BFA) – underground comic book creator
 Tamika Lawrence – actress and singer
 Jerry Livingston – songwriter
 Harvey Mason Jr. – music and film producer
 Linda McCartney – photographer
 James McMurtry – musician
 Dipti Mehta – actress 
 J. Greg Miller – musician 
 Labina Mitevska – Macedonian actress
 Paul Moyer (1964) – Los Angeles television journalist
 Peter Murrieta – 2-time Emmy Award-winning producer and writer, Wizards of Waverly Place
 Craig T. Nelson (1969) – actor
 Lynne Olson – author and journalist
 Brian Ralston – film score composer
 Caroline Rhea – actress and comedian
 Nicole Richie – actress
 Geraldo Rivera (1965) – talk show host, television journalist
 Linda Ronstadt – 11-time Grammy award-winning singer
 Richard Russo – Pulitzer Prize winner for his novel Empire Falls
 Rico Saccani – conductor
 Fritz Scholder – late Native American artist
 Garry Shandling – late actor and comedian
 Harrison Sheckler – pianist and composer 
 Ron Shelton – film screenwriter and director
 Richard Siken (MFA 1994) – poet
 Stephen Spinella – actor
 Barret Swatek – actress
 Jimmy Tatro – actor
Brandon Tatum – conservative commentator
 Vicki Lewis Thompson – author
 Jonathan Van Ness – television and media personality
 Jack Wagner (1982) – actor
 David Foster Wallace – author
 Kate Walsh – actress
 Kristen Wiig – actress, Saturday Night Live cast member
 Christine Woods – actress

Business

 Max Cutler – Podcaster and entrepreneur, founder of Parcast
 Karl Eller – Arizona business leader, namesake of the Eller College of Management
 Rande Gerber – owner of Midnight Oil Bars and other nightlife businesses
 William M. Grace (MBA 1959) – real estate developer and casino owner
 Robert Wood Johnson IV – owner of the New York Jets football club; great-grandson of the founder of Johnson & Johnson
 R. Alexandra Keith (born 1967–1968) – head of Procter & Gamble's global beauty business
 Terry Lundgren – CEO of Federated Department Stores, namesake of The Terry Lundgren Center for Retailing at the university
 Arturo Moreno – owner of the Los Angeles Angels of Anaheim Major League Baseball team, outdoor advertising entrepreneur
 Robert Sarver – managing partner and majority owner of the Phoenix Suns basketball team, director of SkyWest Airlines
 Lisa Song Sutton – businesswoman, attorney, real estate investor, former Miss Nevada United States and former congressional candidate

Law, politics, and government

 Gilbert Baker – Arkansas State Senator
 Ron Barber (BA 1967) – U.S. Representative
 Betsey Bayless (1966) – Arizona Secretary of State 1997–2003
 Stacy Brenner: Democratic member of the Maine State Senate (2020-)
 Jeffrey S. Buchanan (1982) – Lieutenant General, United States Army
 Richard Carmona (MPH 1998) – former U.S. Surgeon General
 Raul Hector Castro (JD 1949) – former Governor of Arizona and ambassador to Argentina
 Richard Harvey Chambers (BA 1929) – chief judge of the United States Court of Appeals for the Ninth Circuit (1959–1976)
 Joseph V. Cuffari (BS 1984) – Inspector General of the Department of Homeland Security
 Frank L. Culin Jr. (BS 1915, MS 1916) – U.S. Army major general
 Dennis DeConcini (BA 1959, LLD 1963) – former U.S. Senator from Arizona (1977–1995)
 David Dewhurst (BA 1967) – Lieutenant Governor of Texas
 Bob Dole – former U.S. Senator and 1996 Republican US Presidential nominee
 Paul Fannin – former Governor of Arizona (1955–1965) and U.S. Senator (1965–1977)
 Samuel Pearson Goddard, Jr. (JD 1949) – former Governor of Arizona (1965–1967)
 Barry Goldwater – former U.S. Senator (1953– 1965, 1969–1987) and 1964 Republican US Presidential nominee
 Howard Hart – Central Intelligence Agency officer
 Carole Hillard (BA 1957) – former Lieutenant Governor of South Dakota
 Tom Hughes (MA 1967) – former mayor of Hillsboro, Oregon
 Richard Hunziker – U.S. Air Force Major General
 Jon Kyl (BA 1964, JD 1966) – former U.S. Representative (1987–1995) and former U.S. Senator (1995–2013, 2018)
 Edna G. Parker (BA 1953) – United States Tax Court judge
 Steve Soboroff – Los Angeles Police Commissioner and former CEO of Playa Vista; former Los Angeles Parks Commissioner
 Nora Sun (BA 1978) – Chinese American diplomat, granddaughter of Sun Yatsen
 Morris K. Udall (JD 1949) – former fifteen-term U.S. Congressman
 Stewart Udall (JD 1948) – former U.S. Congressman, former Secretary of the Interior
 Evan Wallach (BA 1973) – Judge, United States Court of Appeals for the Federal Circuit

Religion
 Spencer W. Kimball – former president of the Church of Jesus Christ of Latter-day Saints
 Frederick Wedge (BA 1920) – Presbyterian pastor and educator, who had boxed professionally as "Kid" Wedge

Science and technology

 Joseph M. Acaba (MS, 1992) – NASA astronaut
 Daniel W. Bradley (PhD) – co-discoverer of Hepatitis C
 Sarah Hörst – Professor of Planetary Sciences at Johns Hopkins University
 Steve Maguire (BS, ?) – software engineer
 Andreas Gerasimos Michalitsianos (BS, 1968) – NASA astrophysicist who contributed to the International Ultraviolet Explorer and the Hubble Space Telescope
 Don Pettit (Ph.D., 1983) – NASA astronaut
 Elisabetta Pierazzo (Ph.D., 1997) -PSI Senior Researcher 
 Brian Schmidt (BS, 1989) – physicist awarded the 2011 Nobel Prize in Physics
 Richard Scobee (BS, 1965) – NASA astronaut
 Christine Siddoway (M.Sc., 1987) – geologist and Antarctic researcher
 Kathryn Stephenson (BA, 1936) – first American woman board-certified plastic surgeon
 Mary Stiner – Professor of AnthropologyCurator of Zooarchaeology at the Arizona State Museum
 Clifford Stoll (Ph.D., 1980) – astronomer
Paul Wehrle (BS, ca. 1943) – pediatrician who helped develop vaccines for polio and smallpox

Sports

 Abdihakem Abdirahman (BA, 2001) – long-distance runner and US 2008 Olympic Trials 10,000 meter champion
 Hassan Adams (BA, 2006) – NBA player
 Deandre Ayton – NBA player
 Kadeem Allen (born 1993), basketball player in the NBA and currently for Hapoel Haifa in the Israeli Basketball Premier League
 Brian N. Anderson (2003) – MLB center fielder
 Rawle Alkins – NBA player
 Gilbert Arenas (2001) – NBA player
 Marisa Baena – LPGA golfer
 Bob Baffert (1977) – 3-time Eclipse Award winner as outstanding thoroughbred trainer
 Adia Barnes (1998) – former WNBA player
 Ricky Barnes – PGA Tour golfer and 2002 US Amateur Champion
 Brigetta Barrett (2013) – Olympic silver medalist in the high jump
 Jason Bates – former Major League Baseball infielder
 Michael Bates – 5-time NFL Pro Bowl kick returner and 1992 Summer Olympics bronze medalist
 Amanda Beard (2003) – swimmer, Olympic gold medalist and 2-time American Swimmer of the Year
 Mike Bell – NFL running back
 Kathryn Bertine (2000) – professional racing cyclist, writer, former figure skater and triathlete
 Mike Bibby – NBA point guard
 Monica Bisordi (2006) – University of Arizona's all-time leading scorer in women's gymnastics
 Erica Blasberg (1984–2010) – LPGA golfer
 Cheri Blauwet (2002) – wheelchair racing, Para-olympic gold medalist
 Lance Briggs – NFL linebacker
 Tedy Bruschi (1996) – NFL linebacker, analyst for ESPN
 Copeland Bryan (BA, 2006) – NFL player
 Chase Budinger – NBA player
 Kurt Busch (1996) – NASCAR driver (attended but did not graduate)
 Will Bynum (born 1983) – basketball player
 Ka'Deem Carey – NFL running back
 Antoine Cason – NFL player, 2007 Jim Thorpe Award winner
 Jack Davis – American football player
 George DiCarlo – Olympic gold medal swimmer
 Sean Elliott – NBA player, number retired by the University of Arizona
 Scott Erickson – former Major League Baseball pitcher, Arizona Wildcat Hall of Fame
 Maryse Éwanjé-Épée (1985) – track and field athlete in the high jump and heptathlon
 Jennie Finch – Olympic gold medal-winning professional women's softball pitcher
 Nick Foles – NFL quarterback, Super Bowl LII MVP
 Nick Folk – NFL kicker
 Terry Francona – MLB player and manager
 Brenda Frese – head women's basketball coach at Maryland (2006 national champs)
 Channing Frye – Former NBA player
 Jim Furyk – PGA Tour golfer and 2003 US Open winner
 Robert Gamez – PGA Tour golfer
 Aaron Gordon – NBA player
 Rob Gronkowski – NFL tight end for the Tampa Bay Buccaneers
 Natalie Gulbis – LPGA golfer
 Chip Hale – Major League Baseball player and coach
 Gavin Harlien – Off-road and stock car racing driver
 Herman Harris – NBA player
 Keith Hartwig – former NFL player
 Ron Hassey – Major League Baseball player and coach
 Chris Henry – NFL player
 Derek Hill – NFL player
 Ed Hochuli – NFL referee
 Trevor Hoffman – 7-time All-Star MLB pitcher
 Alicia Hollowell – national champion softball pitcher
 Jack Howell – Major League Baseball player
 Nick Hundley – MLB player
 Andre Iguodala – NBA player, 2-time NBA Champion, 2015 NBA Finals MVP
 Chase Jeter – basketball player
 Don Janicki — track and field athlete, All-American cross country runner, and winner of the 1987 Holiday Bowl Marathon, the Twin Cities Marathon in 1989, the Cleveland Marathon in 1993 and 1994.
 Richard Jefferson – Former NBA player, analyst
 Jay John – College basketball head coach
 Keshon Johnson – NFL player
 Stanley Johnson – NBA player
 Vance Johnson – NFL player
 Steve Kerr – NBA player, manager and coach
 Scott Kingery – Major League Baseball player
 Spencer Larsen – NFL linebacker
 Rod Lewis – NFL player
 Warren Livingston – NFL player
 Kenny Lofton – Major League Baseball player
 Mark Lyons – basketball player, top scorer in the Israel Basketball Premier League in both 2015 and 2017
 Lauri Markkanen – NBA player
 Stan Mataele – NFL player
 Chris McAlister – NFL cornerback
 Jonathan Meloan – Major League Baseball player
 Frank Middleton – NFL football player
 Josh Miller – NFL punter
 Ryk Neethling – NCAA National Champion swimmer, Olympic gold medalist
 Dennis Northcutt – NFL wide receiver
 Lorena Ochoa – LPGA golfer
 Josh Pastner – college basketball head coach
 Antonio Pierce – NFL linebacker for the New York Giants
 Todd Pletcher (1989) – thoroughbred trainer; 3-time Eclipse Award winner
 Dan Pohl – PGA golfer
 DaShon Polk – NFL linebacker
 Don Pooley – PGA golfer
 Sean Rooks – NBA player
 Rory Sabbatini – PGA Tour golfer
 David Schipper  – Professional soccer player
 Paul Shields – NFL player
 Kobi Simmons – NBA player
 J.T. Snow – MLB player and 6-time Rawlings Golden Glove Award winner
 Annika Sörenstam – LPGA golfer
 Mike Springer – PGA golfer
 Ed Stokes – professional basketball player
 Damon Stoudamire – NBA player
 Salim Stoudamire (2005) – NBA player 
 Allonzo Trier – NBA player
 Kaleb Tarczewski – basketball player
 Jason Terry – NBA player
 Ron Theobald – Major League Baseball player
 Tom Tolbert – NBA player; NBA broadcast analyst
 Mark Tollefsen – basketball player, 2018-19 top scorer in the Israel Basketball Premier League
 Sione Tuihalamaka – Arena Football League player
 Amy Van Dyken – Olympic gold medalist swimmer
 Bobby Wade – NFL wide receiver
 Luke Walton – NBA player, former Sacramento Kings head coach
 Ray Wells – NFL player
 Brian Williams – NBA player
 Derrick Williams – basketball player with Maccabi Tel Aviv of the Israeli Basketball Premier League and the EuroLeague; formerly with five NBA teams; second overall pick in 2011 NBA Draft
 Rodney Williams – American football player
 Michael Wright (1980–2015) – murdered American–Turkish basketball player
 Gabe York – basketball player for Hapoel Tel Aviv of the Israeli Basketball Premier League
 Joe Young – NFL defensive end

Other
 James Gordon Dennis, WWII USAF pilot
 Opal Tometi, co-founder Black Lives Matter
 Laurie Wasserman – mass murderer

Notable faculty and staff

 Alfred Atkinson – president, Montana State University (1920–1937) and University of Arizona (1937–1947)
 Gail Lee Bernstein – historian, one of the pioneers of Japanese women's studies
 Nicolaas Bloembergen – Nobel Laureate in Physics, 1981
 Bart Bok – astronomer
 Mike Candrea – Hall of Fame softball coach
 Andrew Carnie – linguist
 Aurore Chabot – Professor of Ceramic Art
 David Chalmers – philosopher specializing in philosophy of mind
 Hsinchun Chen – McClelland Professor of Management Information Systems; founder of the Artificial Intelligence Lab
 Karletta Chief – environmental scientist
 Noam Chomsky – Laureate Professor of Linguistics
 Cedric Dempsey – executive director of the NCAA, 1993–2002
 William G. Dever – biblical archaeologist
 Xiaohui Fan – astronomer and cosmologist
 Hermann Flaschka – mathematics professor, winner of 1995 Norbert Wiener Prize in Applied Mathematics
 Frances Gillmor  –  folklorist, scholar, and novelist
 Kenneth L. Hale – linguist and polyglot
 Harry Harlow – experimental psychologist
 Eva Simone Hayward – author and researcher in Gender and Women's Studies
 Jenann Ismael – philosopher
 Jennie R. Joe (Navajo), medical anthropologist and director of the Native American Research and Training Center of the Family and Community Medicine Department
 Rich Jorgensen – professor of plant sciences, editor of The Plant Cell
 Gerard P. Kuiper – astronomer, discovered various moons of Jovian planets and the Kuiper Belt
 Willis Lamb – Nobel Laureate in Physics, 1955
 Keith Lehrer – philosophy professor, member of the American Academy of Arts and Sciences
 Fang Lizhi – physicist, helped inspire China's 1989 Pro-Democracy Movement
 Andy Lopez – baseball coach
 Eugene Mackaben – artist
 Fulvio Melia – astrophysicist
 Charles Newman – mathematics professor, now at the Courant Institute
 Shaun Nichols – philosopher
 Peter K. Norquest – linguist
 Antxon Olarrea – professor of linguistics
 Lute Olson – hall of fame basketball coach
 Feryal Özel – astrophysicist
 Johann Rafelski – professor of (theoretical) physics
 Julia Rebeil – professor of music from 1920 to 1969
 Peter M. Rhee – medical school professor and surgeon
 Aric Rindfleisch – marketing author and professor, now at the University of Illinois Urbana-Champaign
 Rich Rodriguez – football coach
 Adam Showman - planetary scientist and professor at the Lunar and Planetary Laboratory
 Vernon L. Smith – economics professor, Nobel Laureate in Economics, 2002
 Daniel L. Stein – mathematics and physics professor, dean of science at New York University

 Andrew Weil – pioneer in integrative medicine
 Peter Wild – poet, author, and Professor of English (1940–2009)
 Arthur Winfree – theoretical biologist, winner of 2000 Norbert Wiener Prize in Applied Mathematics
 Ralph Walter Graystone Wyckoff – professor of microbiology and physics, did pioneering work in X-ray crystallography
 Vladimir E. Zakharov – Regents' professor of mathematics, winner of 2003 Dirac Prize

References

Lists of people by university or college in Arizona